Puerto Aroma is a small town in Bolivia.

References

Populated places in La Paz Department (Bolivia)